Eurhopalothrix is a genus of ants in the subfamily Myrmicinae.

Species

Eurhopalothrix alopeciosa Brown & Kempf, 1960
Eurhopalothrix apharogonia Snelling, 1968
Eurhopalothrix australis Brown & Kempf, 1960
Eurhopalothrix biroi (Szabó, 1910)
Eurhopalothrix bolaui (Mayr, 1870)
Eurhopalothrix brevicornis (Emery, 1897)
Eurhopalothrix browni Taylor, 1990
Eurhopalothrix bruchi (Santschi, 1922)
Eurhopalothrix caledonica Brown & Kempf, 1960
Eurhopalothrix chapmani Taylor, 1990
Eurhopalothrix cimu Longino, 2013
Eurhopalothrix cinnamea Taylor, 1970
Eurhopalothrix circumcapillum Longino, 2013
Eurhopalothrix clypeata Brown & Kempf, 1960
Eurhopalothrix coronata Taylor, 1990
Eurhopalothrix depressa Ketterl, Verhaagh & Dietz, 2004
Eurhopalothrix dubia Taylor, 1990
Eurhopalothrix elke Mezger & Pfeiffer, 2010
Eurhopalothrix emeryi (Forel, 1912)
Eurhopalothrix floridana Brown & Kempf, 1960
Eurhopalothrix gravis (Mann, 1922)
Eurhopalothrix greensladei Taylor, 1968
Eurhopalothrix guadeloupensis Longino, 2013
Eurhopalothrix heliscata Wilson & Brown, 1985
Eurhopalothrix hoplites Taylor, 1980
Eurhopalothrix hunhau Longino, 2013
Eurhopalothrix insidiatrix (Taylor, 1980)
Eurhopalothrix isabellae (Mann, 1919)
Eurhopalothrix jennya Taylor, 1990
Eurhopalothrix lenkoi Kempf, 1967
Eurhopalothrix mabuya Longino, 2013
Eurhopalothrix machaquila Longino, 2013
Eurhopalothrix megalops Longino, 2013
Eurhopalothrix omnivaga Taylor, 1990
Eurhopalothrix ortizae Longino, 2013
Eurhopalothrix oscillum Longino, 2013
Eurhopalothrix papuana (De Andrade, 2007)
Eurhopalothrix philippina Brown & Kempf, 1960
Eurhopalothrix pilulifera Brown & Kempf, 1960
Eurhopalothrix platisquama Taylor, 1990
Eurhopalothrix procera (Emery, 1897)
Eurhopalothrix punctata (Szabó, 1910)
Eurhopalothrix rothschildi Taylor, 1990
Eurhopalothrix schmidti (Menozzi, 1936)
Eurhopalothrix seguensis Taylor, 1990
Eurhopalothrix semicapillum Longino, 2013
Eurhopalothrix sepultura Longino, 2013
Eurhopalothrix speciosa Brown & Kempf, 1960
Eurhopalothrix spectabilis Kempf, 1962
Eurhopalothrix szentivanyi Taylor, 1968
Eurhopalothrix vulcan Longino, 2013
Eurhopalothrix xibalba Longino, 2013
Eurhopalothrix zipacna Longino, 2013

References

External links

Myrmicinae
Ant genera